The 2012 European Le Mans Series was the ninth season of the Automobile Club de l'Ouest's European Le Mans Series (previously known as simply Le Mans Series). Championship titles were awarded in five categories, with the Le Mans Series shifting its categories following its separation from the FIA World Endurance Championship. LMP1 cars were dropped due to most teams entering the FIA World Endurance Championship while a new GTC category was created to allow single make grand tourer cars and FIA GT3s to compete in endurance races. However, there were no GTC cars that competed during the season.

Due to the numerous issues the season was reduced to just three rounds, starting in Le Castellet, France on 1 April and ended at Braselton, Georgia, United States, on 20 October.

Schedule
Following the ELMS decision to no longer share races with the FIA World Endurance Championship (formerly the Intercontinental Le Mans Cup), the series required new races to replace the Spa-Francorchamps and Silverstone races which now were part of the WEC. Circuit Paul Ricard was the only event carried over from 2011 and remained the season opener. Circuit Zolder was supposed to serve as the second round of the series, but on 1 April the race was cancelled due to a lack of entrants. ELMS teams were instead invited to enter the 6 Hours of Spa WEC round.  Following a small number of entries at Donington, the season's two later rounds at the Brno Circuit and Autódromo Internacional do Algarve were cancelled. In place of these two rounds, an agreement was reached with the American Le Mans Series to allow ELMS competitors to participate in the Petit Le Mans for double points, with the ELMS providing transport assistance to full-season teams.

Regulation changes
The Le Mans Series made changes to its class structure for the 2012 season, eliminating one previous class while adding another.  The LMP1 Le Mans Prototype category were no longer featured in LMS races due to the large amount of LMP1 factory teams which switched from the Le Mans Series to the World Endurance Championship.  This move promotes the LMP2 category to the top of the class structure.  To replace LMP1, a new class has been created at the bottom of the class structure, named GTC.  This class allowed only three cars from various one make series to compete: The Ferrari 458 Challenge, Porsche 911 GT3 Cup, and the Lotus Evora GT4.  Teams in GTC were not allowed more than one professional driver in their line-up.  Finally, the Formula Le Mans category was renamed LMP Challenge, aligning with the title utilized by the American Le Mans Series.

Entry list

Season results

Championship Standings

Points are awarded to cars that finish in tenth place or higher, with unclassified entries failing to complete 70% of the race distance or entries failing to reach the finish not earning championship points. One bonus point is awarded for winning pole position (denoted by bold).  Double points will be awarded at Petit Le Mans.

Teams Championships
The top two finishers in the LMP2, GTE Pro, and GTE Am championships earn automatic entry to the 2013 24 Hours of Le Mans.

LMP2 Standings

LMPC Standings

LM GTE Pro Standings

LM GTE Am Standings

Drivers Championships

LMP2 Standings

LMPC Standings

LM GTE Pro Standings

LM GTE Am Standings

Manufacturers Cups

LMP2 Standings

LM GTE Standings

References

External links
 European Le Mans Series

 
European Le Mans Series
European Le Mans Series
European Le Mans Series seasons